Viktor Vasilyevich Ilyushin (born 4 June 1947) is a Russian politician who served as First Deputy Prime Minister of Russia and assistant to President of Russia from 14 August 1996 to 17 March 1997.

References 

1947 births
Living people
Russian politicians
Deputy heads of government of the Russian Federation